Audresselles is a commune south of Cape Gris Nez in the Pas-de-Calais department in northern France.

In the 12th century it was known as Oderzelle.

History

Between the end of English occupation in 1558 and the middle of the 17th century, Audresselles seigneury included Haringzelle hamlet; today, this is now a forest hiding the former German artillery batteries of Audinghen. This seigneury was owned by the Acary family, which gave some admirals to the French fleet and from whom most of the borough fishermen are descended.

An old fishers village, Audresselles has kept its characteristic features: its long houses with a colored strip along the lower part of the walls, in the village center, and some villas of the "Belle Époque" in front of the English Channel. Professional fishing families still live in Audresselles, and one of them uses the village sand beach to land its ship. The traditional flobarts (little truncated drakkars) are still used by the holiday yachtsmen.

Population

Sights

 The Church of Saint John the Baptist, fortified, 12th century, with large canvas of the Second Empire painted in the Catholic workhalls of father Jacques Paul Migne by Arthur Gilbert and a little 18th century reredos.
 Saint-John farm (11th century) with the stone-cross of the crusader in the front wall;
 The coaching inn, rue Édouard Quénu (18th century).
 The panoramic allée Maurice Boitel

Beach and dune fauna

Birds
Gulls, cormorants, jackdaws, loons, mallards, bitterns, sandpipers, snipes, oystercatchers, herons, curlews, egrets, guillemots, peregrine falcons, swans, and geese.

Marine mammals
Some black-headed seals have settled down in the creeks behind the village since July 2006 and dislike to be disturbed, following the swimmers to the beach. Also present are Orcas (killer whales), pilot whales, dolphins and porpoises.

Flora
Plants of this region are those that can resist the salt-laden southwesterly wind. Species include Lyciet, privet, spindle-tree, eleagnus, speedwell, marram grass and Armeria maritima.

Personalities
 Robert Beauvais, writer and journalist
 Albert Besson, bacteriologist
 Maurice Boitel, painter
 Carolus-Duran, painter
 Albert-Ernest Carrier-Belleuse, painter
 Henri Dutilleux, composer
 Arthur Gilbert, English painter. Paintings of him can be seen in the choir of the church;
 Philippe de Hauteclocque said Leclerc, marshal of France
 Edmond Marin la Meslée, aviator
 Catherine Destivelle, alpinist

See also
Communes of the Pas-de-Calais department

References

Bibliography
"Audresselles, éléments d'une histoire", éd. Association Mémoire d'Audresselles, by Daniel Leunens.
"Rivages boulonnais", éd. Association Mémoire d'Audresselles, by Olivier Lazzarotti (December 2006).
"Nobiliaire de Picardie", page 1, written in 1698 by Jérôme Bignon.

External links

Photographs of Audresselles
Audresselles.at - unBlog.fr dompaul2.unblog.fr/

Communes of Pas-de-Calais
Populated coastal places in France